DNF Duel is a fighting video game co-developed by Arc System Works, Eighting and Neople, and published by Nexon. It is a spin-off of the Dungeon & Fighter series and it was released for the Microsoft Windows, PlayStation 4, and PlayStation 5 on 28 June 2022. A Nintendo Switch port is scheduled for an April 2023 release.

Gameplay 
Gameplay is similar to other fighting games developed by Arc System Works but with more simplified mechanics. Like some previous games, the game features simplified inputs to allow new players to be able to get into the game without being put off by complicated controls. One big difference in this game is the use of an MP bar that is used to activate certain attacks, called "skills" in the game, similar to the main series games and other RPGs. Though the bar disappears after each use of a skill, it slowly regenerates over time, unlike the use of special meters found in other fighting games.

Characters 
The base roster includes 15 playable characters with 1 additional character being unlockable through gameplay directly coming from the main series. In December 2022, its first downloadable content character, Spectre, was announced alongside a season pass with four additional DLC fighters.

Plot
The story of DNF Duel is set in an astral plane full of gates, one of many alternate realities created in the aftermath of the destructive event known as the Great Metastasis. Each gates connects to other places in time and space exist, allowing its inhabitants to cross to other dimensions at will. Suddenly, the gates malfunctions and ultimately shuts down altogether, in an event known as "The Day the Doors Closed", and as their powers faded into myth the gates became known as "Wonders".

Moving forward to the present day, the fates of several adventures and warriors begin to converge in the Principality of Bel Myre. Each arms with their own "Wills", the special power that hides its true potential has recently awakened the Wonders once again, and upholds the future fates of both gates and multiverse.

Development 
The game was first announced at Dungeon & Fighter Universe Festival on 26 December 2020, with a teaser trailer. A beta was held from 17 December through 20 December 2021 with 10 playable characters and a second, last beta from 1 April to 4 April 2022, with 11 characters. Patch 1.04 was announced on 18 August, which includes several balance changes and bug fixes.

Reception 

DNF Duel received "generally favorable" reviews, according to review aggregator Metacritic.

Destructoid liked the game's chaotic nature, ambitious premise, attractive roster, extensive training menus, and stable rollback netcode, and noted that the rote narrative, lack of crossplay, high-budget visuals, and high price tag as factors that held it back. GameSpot gave praise to the accessible yet deep fighting system, roster variety, and "exceptional" online play, but felt the "story mode isn't much of a story" and that the learning curve would prove to be steep for casual players. Hardcore Gamer praised the title's visuals, writing, "The animation quality and art direction make this one of those games that is almost as entertaining to watch as it is to play." IGN awarded the title a score of 8/10 and wrote, "DNF Duel is a game of resource management, patience, and creative problem solving wrapped up in a beautiful package, although it may not be as friendly to newcomers as intended." The site further praised the variety of offline modes, flexible fighting system, distinct roster, solid netcode, striking art style, and bonus content while criticizing the dull story mode and generic music. Shacknews similarly praised the solid, varied cast of fighters, "beautiful" visuals and soundtrack, stable netcode, and abundance of modes but took minor issue with the flimsy character balance and overly accessible controls. VG247 called DNF Duel "a perplexing cocktail of well-implemented accessibility options" and gave high praise to the rollback netcode but noted that the story was "not exactly the most substantial offering...seen [in] single-player story modes."

References

External links 
 Official website

2022 video games
2.5D fighting games
Arc System Works games
Dungeon & Fighter (video game series)
Eighting games
Nintendo Switch games
PlayStation 4 games
PlayStation 5 games
Unreal Engine games
Video game sequels
Video games developed in Japan
Video games developed in South Korea
Video games with 2.5D graphics
Video games with cel-shaded animation
Video games with cross-platform play
Windows games